A Hundred Miles Off is the third album by The Walkmen, released on May 23, 2006 in the United States.

Track listing and Personnel
 "Louisiana" – 3:52
 Hamilton Leithauser - vocals, guitar
 Paul maroon - piano
 Peter Bauer - lead guitar
 Walter Martin - bass
 Matt Barrick - drums
 Tom Peloso - trumpet
 "Danny's at the Wedding" – 3:55
 Hamilton Leithauser - vocals, guitar
 Paul Maroon - guitar
 Walter Martin - bass, piano, percussion
 Matt Barrick - drums
 "Good for You's Good for Me" – 2:22
 Hamilton Leithauser - vocals, guitar
 Paul Maroon - guitar
 Peter Bauer - organ
 Walter Martin - bass
 Matt Barrick - drums
 "Emma, Get Me a Lemon" – 3:12
 Hamilton Leithauser - vocals, guitar
 Paul Maroon - guitar
 Peter Bauer - organ
 Walter Martin - bass, lap steel guitar, djembe
 Matt Barrick - drums
 "All Hands and the Cook" – 4:09
 Hamilton Leithauser - guitar, vocals, piano
 Peter Bauer - organ
 Walter Martin - bass, drums, percussion
 "Lost in Boston" – 3:42
 Hamilton Leithauser - vocals, guitar
 Paul Maroon - guitar
 Peter Bauer - organ, percussion
 Walter Martin - bass, percussion
 Matt Barrick - drums, percussion
 "Don't Get Me Down (Come on Over Here)" – 4:04
 Hamilton Leithauser - vocals, guitar
 Paul Maroon - guitar
 Peter Bauer - organ
 Walter Martin - bass, percussion
 Matt Barrick - drums
 "Tenley Town" – 3:03
 Hamilton Leithauser - vocals
 Paul Maroon - guitar
 Walter Martin - bass
 Matt Barrick - drums
 "This Job Is Killing Me" – 3:28
 Hamilton Leithauser - vocals, guitar
 Paul Maroon - guitar
 Peter Bauer - organ, piano
 Walter Martin - bass, percussion
 Matt Barrick - drums
 "Brandy Alexander" – 2:32
 Hamilton Leithauser - vocals, guitar
 Walter Martin - bass, djembe, percussion
 Matt Barrick - drums
 "Always After You ('Til You Started After Me)" – 3:39
 Hamilton Leithauser - vocals
 Paul Maroon - guitar
 Peter Bauer - organ
 Walter Martin - bass
 Matt Barrick - drums
 "Another One Goes By" – 3:56
 Hamilton Leithauser - vocals, guitar
 Paul Maroon - lead guitar, piano
 Peter Bauer - organ
 Walter Martin - bass, percussion
 Matt Barrick - drums

 The track "Another One Goes By" is a cover of a song by the band Mazarin.

The track "Brandy Alexander" is featured in the 2008 film In Bruges.

Singles
 "Louisiana" (September 11, 2006)
 US 7" vinyl: "Louisiana" / "Another One Goes By"
 UK CD: "Louisiana" / "Another One Goes By" / "Lost in Boston"
 UK 7" vinyl picture disc: "Louisiana" / "Lost in Boston"

References

The Walkmen albums
2006 albums